Jonathan Clyde Parris (September 11, 1922 – July 9, 2016) was a Panamanian infielder in the American Negro leagues in the 1940s.

A native of Panama City, Panama, Parris played for the Baltimore Elite Giants in 1946, and the New York Black Yankees in 1946 and 1947. Following his Negro leagues career, he played minor league baseball through 1960, including five years with the Montreal Royals of the International League. Parris died in Valley Stream, New York in 2016 at age 93.

References

External links
 and Seamheads

1922 births
2016 deaths
Baltimore Elite Giants players
New York Black Yankees players
Panamanian expatriate baseball players in the United States
Sportspeople from Panama City
St. Jean Braves players
Pueblo Dodgers players
Miami Sun Sox players
Elmira Pioneers players
Montreal Royals players
Dallas Rangers players
Toronto Maple Leafs (International League) players
Sultanes de Monterrey players
Panamanian expatriate baseball players in Canada
Panamanian expatriate baseball players in Mexico
Baseball infielders